Strømer is a 1976 Danish crime drama film directed by Anders Refn.

Cast
Jens Okking as Karl Jørgensen
Lotte Hermann as Vera Jørgensen
Bodil Kjer as Sabine Lund
Birgit Sadolin as Grete Svendsholm
Otto Brandenburg as Willer Johansen
Henning Palner as Palle Møller
Preben Harris as Eskebjerg
Holger Juul Hansen as Kramer
Bendt Rothe as Mester
Ove Verner Hansen as Max Thorsen
Dick Kaysø as John Bullnes
Lizzie Corfixen as Topsy
Anne Marie Helger as Marianne
Inger Stender as Fru Severinsen
Ulla Jessen as Bente
Lene Vasegaard as Blonde
Annie Birgit Garde as Politician's wife
Jørgen Kiil as Politician
Gösta Schwarck as Coach Heine Grün
Finn Nielsen as Bonanza
Lars Lunøe as Mayor Heidersvold
Baard Owe as Skull
Preben Lerdorff Rye as Fessor
Bent Børgesen as Christian Warnebue
Erik Kühnau as Warnebue's henchman
Poul Glargaard as Warnebue's henchman
Peter Ronild as Redaktør Arnold
Birger Jensen as Staldkarl
Alvin Linnemann as Guest at the Guesthouse
Flemming Quist Møller as Tasketyv
Alberte Winding as Lis
Jesper Christensen as Police officer
André Sallyman as Lawyer
Voja Miladinowiç as Fremmedarbejder i politiforhør
Erik Høyer as Getaway driver

External links

1976 crime drama films
1970s mystery films
1970s psychological thriller films
Police detective films
Danish crime drama films
1970s Danish-language films
Films directed by Anders Refn